Business Casual may refer to:
 Business casual, a dress code
 Business Casual (Beep Beep album)
 Business Casual (Chromeo album)
 Business Casual (EP), an EP by We Are Scientists